Joël Stephanus Voordewind (born 9 July 1965 in Sleen, Drenthe) is a Dutch politician and former development aid worker. As a member of the Christian Union (ChristenUnie) he was an MP from 2006 until 2021. He focused on matters of foreign policy, defense, development aid, youth and family. Since 7 July 2022, he has been an alderman of Alkmaar.

Biography 
Voordewind, after receiving a degree in political sciences (with a specialization in international relations) at VU University Amsterdam, started working as an assistant for the Dutch Labour parliamentary party. He began in 1991 and left the party in 1994. After this he worked for the European Union, the United Nations and an international Christian aid organisation named Dorcas Aid. For some time he was committed as a spokesman to the Dutch Secretary of Defence.

After some time Voordewind came to the conclusion that because of his Christian convictions, it would be better if he switched to a Christian party. He made this decision in 1999 and began to work for the parliamentary group of the Christian Union. In 2001 he became their campaign leader for the Dutch general election in 2002. He also led the campaign towards the general election in 2003. In 2003 he was a member of the States-Provincial of North Holland. Until 2006 he was head of the public relations division of the party. He was chairman of the local Christian Union in the Dutch capital Amsterdam for which in 2002 and 2006 he stood for the local council, but both times the CU gained no seats.

Voordewind was elected into the Dutch Parliament in 2006. He was the fourth name on the candidate list of the Christian Union, which doubled its number of seats from three to six. For this party he was the spokesman for all issues concerning the health system, welfare and sports, defence and European Affairs.

He is married and the father of two children. He lives in Amsterdam and is a member of a Dutch Vineyard-church.

Electoral history

References 
  Parlement.com biography

External links 

  Alderman Joël Voordewind, Municipality of Alkmaar website

1965 births
Living people
21st-century Dutch politicians
Aldermen in North Holland
Association of Vineyard Churches
Christian Union (Netherlands) politicians
Dutch anti-poverty advocates
Dutch evangelicals
Dutch humanitarians
Dutch nonprofit directors
Dutch political scientists
Members of the House of Representatives (Netherlands)
People from Alkmaar
People from Coevorden
People in international development
Vrije Universiteit Amsterdam alumni